The Koos Group (KGI) is a Taiwan-based pan-Asian business group involved in a vast range of industries, which include banking, manufacturing, petrochemicals, electronics, leasing, cement, financial services, hospitality, real estate, private equity, manufacturing, and investment banking.

History
The company was founded in the latter 19th century by Koo Hsien-jung, during the period of Japanese rule in Taiwan. It is majority-owned by the Koo family. The company was headed by Koo Chen-fu and Jeffrey Koo Sr. from 1940 until their deaths in 2005 and 2012 respectively.

Operations
The Koos Group encompasses over 80 companies, with more than 60,000 employees worldwide. In 2001, The Wall Street Journal reported total assets of the Koos Group to be US$36 Billion. Today, the total assets of the Koos Group are estimated to be over US$225 Billion.

Koos Group is headquartered in Taipei. It has operations in Taiwan, Hong Kong (KGI Hong Kong Group since 1997) and Singapore (KGI Securities Singapore). Its holding company is CTBC Bank.

Units
 KGI Securities Company Limited
 KGI Securities Investment Trust Company Limited
 KGI Securities Investment Advisory Company Limited
 KGI Futures Company Limited

See also
Chinatrust
Chinatrust Whales

References
https://www.forbes.com/companies/ctbc-financial/?list=global2000&sh=6ce3c60e5049

External links
Official Koos Group International website

Companies based in Taipei
Holding companies of Taiwan
Multinational companies headquartered in Taiwan
 
1890s establishments in Taiwan